La Roque or De la Roque may refer to:

Places
 La Roque-Alric, a commune in the Vaucluse department in the Provence-Alpes-Côte d'Azur region in southeastern France
 La Roque-Baignard, a commune in the department of Calvados in the Basse-Normandie region in northern France
 La Roque-Esclapon, a commune in the Var department in the Provence-Alpes-Côte d'Azur region in southeastern France
 La Roque-Gageac, a commune in the Dordogne department in Aquitaine, south-western France
 La Roque-Sainte-Marguerite, a commune in the Aveyron department in southern France
 La Roque-sur-Cèze, a commune in the Gard department in southern France
 La Roque-sur-Pernes, a commune in the Vaucluse department in the Provence-Alpes-Côte d'Azur region in southeastern France
 Saint-Samson-de-la-Roque, a commune in the Eure department in Haute-Normandie in northern France

Other uses
 La Roque (play), a play by American dramatist and playwright John Augustus Stone

People with the surname
 Jean de la Roque (1661–1745), a French traveller and journalist
 François de La Rocque (6 October 1885 – 28 April 1946), French leader of Croix-de-feu

See also
 Larroque (disambiguation)
 Roque (disambiguation)
 La Rocque, a commune in the department of Calvados in the Basse-Normandie region in northern France